Order of the Palgwae was an order of chivalry of the Korean Empire that was given to military personnels and officials. It was established on 16 April 1901. The order was divided into eight classes.

Form 
Order of the Palgwae had eight gwaes in the middle. For 1st classes, it had daesu. Width of the daesu was about 11.4 cm. 2nd class, it had medal with the daesu. Medal's perimeter was about 9 cm. Perimeter of 3rd class was about 5.4cm. 3rd class and 4th class was the same but the shape of ring was different. 5th class was same as 4th class but, the perimeter was 4.5cm. 6th to 8th class was the same as 5th class but they were made of silver.

Like Order of the Taegeuk,  1st Class of the order is either Badge (with Daesu) or Medal. Daesu was worn from the right shoulder to the left flank and medal was worn in left breast. 2nd Class of the order is either Badge (with Daesu) or Necklet. Daesu was worn from the right shoulder to the left flank and necklet was worn on neck. 3rd Class was necklet and worn on neck. Lastly, 4th to 8th class were decorations and was worn in left breast.

Notable recipients

1st Class 

 Kototada Fujinami on 24 September 1904 
 Gwon Jung-Hyeon on 25 October 1904
 Toyosaburo Ochiai on 18 January 1905
 Yi Geun-taek on 21 May 1905

2nd Class 

 Yi Yong-ik on 14 November 1902
 Yi Geun-taek on 22 February 1905

3rd Class 

 Yi Byeong-mu on 15 January 1906
 Kim Yung-Han on 30 October 1907

 Yun Chi-sung on 28 October 1909

References 

Orders, decorations, and medals of the Korean Empire
1901 establishments in Korea
Awards established in 1901
Orders of chivalry